Perek may refer to:

 Luboš Perek, a Czech astronomer 
 a part of a masekhet